MV Phillip Pendal is a ferry owned by the Public Transport Authority and operated under contract by Captain Cook Cruises on Transperth services on the Swan River in Perth, Western Australia.

History
In 2009, SBF Shipbuilders of Henderson was awarded a contract to build a new ferry for Transperth to replace . It entered service on 3 May 2009 named after politician Phillip Pendal.

References

External links

Ferries of Western Australia
Ships built in Western Australia
2009 ships